Hub Power Company Limited, colloquially known as HUBCO, is the first and largest Pakistani Independent Power Producer (IPP) with a combined installed power generation capacity of 3250 MW. 

HUBCO is the only power producer in Pakistan with four projects listed in the China-Pakistan Economic Corridor (CPEC), Thar Energy Limited, ThalNova, Sindh Engro Coal Mining Company and China power Hub generation Company. Out of these four projects only one is under construction — Thalnova Power Thar (Pvt) Ltd whereas China Power Hub Generation Company  (CPHGC) and Thar Energy Limited is already contributing electricity to the national grid. Hub Power Company stock is traded on the Pakistan Stock Exchange.

Organisation structure 

Subsidiaries
 Narowal Energy Limited (NEL): Wholly owned by HUBCO. It manages and operates the Narowal Power Plant
 Hub Power Services Limited (HPSL): Wholly owned subsidiary of HUBCO
 Hub Power Holdings (HPHL): Incorporated to invest in future growth projects
 Thar Energy Limited (TEL): HUBCO has 60% shareholding in TEL which is setting up a 330-megawatt (MW) Thar Lignite Coal-based mine mouth Power Plant and is a part of the China-Pakistan Economic Corridor (CPEC)
 Laraib Energy Limited (LEL): HUBCO owns 74.95% of LEL which is the owner and developer of the New Bong Escape Power Project

Associates
 China Power Hub Generation Company (CPHGC) is the project company for the development, construction and operation of 2×660 MW Coal-fired Power Plant in Hub, Balochistan near the Hub plant. HUBCO has 46% stake in CPHGC
 Sindh Engro Company Limited (SECMC) is an open-pit mining company in which HUBCO has 8% stake
 ThalNova Power Thar (Pvt.) Ltd. is a 330 MW mine-mouth lignite fired power plant in which HUBCO has acquired majority shares 

Management team
Kamran Kamal, CEO HUBCO 
Saleemullah Memon, CEO Thar Energy Limited & ThalNova Power Thar Pvt. Ltd.
Abdul Nasir, CFO HUBCO
Amjad Raja, VP Operations
Fayyaz Bhatti, VP Strategic & Regulatory Affairs
Faiza Kapadia, Head of Legal & Company Secretary
Muhammad Talha, Head of Human Resources, Corporate Communication & Digitalization

Plants currently providing electricity to Pakistan 
 Hub Plant (1,292 MW) is located 60 km from Karachi in Hub. The electricity at Hub is generated by four 323 megawatt oil-fired units that are supplied by a 78 km long pipeline from Pakistan State Oil. It consists of four generating units, each unit has capacity of 323 MW gross output, with an oil-fired single re-heat boiler and tandem compound and two cylinder condensing steam turbines directly coupled to a hydrogen cooled generator.

 Narowal Power Plant (225 MW) located in Narowal, Punjab consists of 11 generating sets, 11 Alborg Heat Recovery Steam Generators and one air cooled condensing Steam Turbine from Dresser Rand.
 New Bong Escape Power Project (84 MW), located in Mirpur, Azad Jammu& Kashmir, commenced commercial operations on 23 March 2013 and has the distinction of being Pakistan and AJ&K's first hydropower IPP. The Project uses the water discharged from an upstream already existing hydropower plant located at Mangla Dam.
China Power Hub Generation Company (CPHGC) Power Plant (1320 MW) is an imported coal-based plant supplying energy to the national grid and located at Hub. The CPHGC plant consists of two generating units each rated at 660 MW Gross, with each unit having GE supercritical boilers, steam turbine and generator sets.

Other projects 
Sindh Engro Company Limited (SECMC) has developed a coal mine at Thar which has the seventh largest reserves of coal in the World. SECMC achieved Commercial Operations for Phase I in July, 2019 and will be embarking to double its coal mining capacity to supply fuel to HUBCO's Thar Energy Limited and ThalNova projects which are under construction.
Thar Energy Limited (TEL) Project is a lignite-based 330 MW project. The project achieved commercial operations on 10th October, 2022.
 ThalNova Power Thar Pvt. Ltd (TNPTL) is also a 330 MW mine-mouth lignite-fired power plant similar to TEL. The commencement of the commercials operations of this project is expected around the start of January 2023.

Prime International Oil & Gas Company 
In March 2021, Eni exited the Pakistani market and sold its assets to Prime International Oil & Gas Company. The deal include the assets acquired, interests in eight development and production leases and four exploration licences. Prime International Oil & Gas Company, a newly established joint venture (JV) between Eni Pakistan local employees and Hub Power Company.

Financial Performance 
For the year ended June 30, 2021, HUBCO has posted consolidated profit after tax (PAT) of Rs 33.7 billion.

History 
 On 1 August 1991, The Hub Power Company Limited was incorporated in Pakistan as a public limited company.
 In 1997, the construction of Hub Power Plant (1292 MW), the first oil-fired IPP in Pakistan, was completed.
 In 2011, the 225 MW Narowal Thermal Power Project reached completion.
 In 2013, Laraib Run of the River Hydel Plant was constructed. It was the first hydel IPP in Pakistan.
 In January 2015, HUBCO announced that it will set up 1,320 MW coal-based power plants next to its thermal power station at Hub in Balochistan. The two plants would be initially run on imported coal for which a coal jetty would also be developed.
 In 2018, partial shares were taken over by Mega Conglomerate Pvt. Ltd. This resulted in the Chairmanship being relinquished by Hussain Dawood and assumed by Habibullah Khan.
 In 2018, HPHL (wholly owned subsidiary of HUBCO) acquired 37% stake in ThalNova Power Thar (Pvt.) Ltd.
 In 2019, the 1320 MW (2x660 MW) China Power Hub Generation Company Private Limited (CPHGC) Project with integrated Jetty started operations.
 A lignite-based 330 MW Thar Energy Limited (TEL)Project in Thar Block II commenced its operations in October 2022.

Growth aspirations 
 Water Solutions: Aim to solve the water crisis in the country through water desalination and purification projects.
 Renewable Energy: Expansion of business by venturing into wind energy projects.

Corporate social responsibility 
Since inception of the company, its Corporate social responsibility (CSR) program has been heavily investing in uplifting local communities. In 2022 alone, the group invested PKR 202 Million on initiatives under the following major categories:
 Education
 Healthcare
 Infrastructure Development
 Livelihood

The company has set up initiatives to develop communities around its plants. It provides education and healthcare by setting up schools and medical facilities. The Company improves the physical infrastructure of the local communities by providing clean water and installing solar systems. It helps improve the livelihood of the local populace through projects such as the HUBCO Rahnuma Program where employees volunteer their time, skills, and efforts to develop communities near plants. HUBCO aims to hire local workers and in line with this provides vocational training programs.

Awards and accolades 

Hub Power Company has achieved the following:
 Top 7th position in the “Billion Dollar” Club since 2009.
 First Independent Power Producer in the world.
 Won the PSX Top 25 Companies Award in 2002, 2003, 2010, 2017, 2018 and 2022.
Digital Innovator of the Year in Optimizing Operations Category awarded by General Electrics (GE) in 2017.
 Winner of Best Place to Work in 2019 conferred by Engage Consulting & Pakistan Society of Human Resource Management (PSHRM).
 Received the Corporate Excellence Award conferred by Management Association of Pakistan (MAP) in 2019, 2020, 2021 and 2022.
 Winner of Gender Diversity at Workplace Award conferred by the CFA Society at the 17th Corporate Excellence Award in 2020.
Awarded Notable Growth in Women Empowerment at OICCI's (Overseas Investors Chamber of Commerce & Industry) Women Empowerment Awards 2020.

See also 
 List of power stations in Pakistan

References

External links 
 Hub Power Company Limited

Companies listed on the Pakistan Stock Exchange
Electric power companies of Pakistan
Pakistani companies established in 1994
Energy companies established in 1994
Energy in Balochistan, Pakistan
Companies based in Karachi